Tetrahydroxybenzenes or Benzenetetrols are a group of organic compounds which are tetrahydroxy derivatives of benzene. Tetrahydroxybenzene comes in three isomers:

1,2,3,4-Tetrahydroxybenzene
1,2,3,5-Tetrahydroxybenzene
1,2,4,5-Tetrahydroxybenzene

All isomers share the molecular weight 142.11 g/mol and the chemical formula C6H6O4.

See also 
 Dihydroxybenzenes
 Trihydroxybenzenes
 Pentahydroxybenzene
 Hexahydroxybenzene

Phenols